Jafir (also Romanized as Jafīr) is a village in Bani Saleh Rural District, Neysan District, Hoveyzeh County, Khuzestan Province, Iran. At the 2006 census, its population was 215, in 42 families.

References 

Populated places in Hoveyzeh County